Luis Jesús Fernández de Córdoba y Salabert, 17th Duke of Medinaceli, GE (16 January 1880 – 13 July 1956), was a Spanish nobleman and distinguished hunter. He was born the world's most titled person since his father, the 16th Duke, had died months before in a hunting accident. He was 11 times a duke, 17 a marquess, 15 a count and 4 a viscount.

Early life

Born as the only son of the 16th Duke of Medinaceli, Luis María Fernández de Córdoba y Pérez de Barradas, and his second wife Casilda Remigia de Salabert y Arteaga, 9th Marchioness of Torrecilla. He was baptised the day after his birth in the parish church of San Luis Obispo of Madrid. He was born posthumously to his father, who had died in a hunting accident some months earlier and as such he assumed the historical titles of the House of Medinaceli from birth.

His mother, who would become the 11th Duchess of Ciudad Real in her own right, remarried the politician Mariano Fernández de Henestrosa, 1st Duke of Santo Mauro, in 1884. Through them, Luis was a half brother to Rafael and Casilda Fernández de Henestrosa.

Marriage and issue

In 1911, he married Ana María Fernández de Henestrosa y Gayoso de los Cobos, lady-in-waiting of Queen Ena, daughter of the 8th Count of Moriana del Río, a Gentilhombre Grandee of Alfonso XIII. The ceremony took place in Madrid.

From his first marriage he had two daughters:

Victoria Eugenia Fernández de Córdoba y Fernández de Henestrosa, 18th Duchess of Medinaceli (Madrid, April 16, 1917 - Seville, August 18, 2013)
María de la Paz Fernández de Córdoba y Fernández de Henestrosa (Madrid, January 22, 1919 - Alcalá de los Gazules, October 3, 1998), who would become the 16th Duchess of Lerma in 1957

In 1938 his first wife Ana María died. He remarried on December 22, 1939, with María de la Concepción Rey de Pablo Blanco, with which he had a daughter:

Casilda Fernández de Córdoba y de Pablo Blanco (Madrid, 1941 - Córdoba, April 19, 1998), 20th Duchess of Cardona

Later life

In 1929, he was granted the Order of the Golden Fleece by Alfonso XIII. The collar he had been bestowed with had once belonged to Louis Bonapart, Napoleon's younger brother.

He inherited his fondness for hunting and horse-riding from his grandmother Angela Pérez de Barradas y Bernuy, 1st Duchess of Denia and Tarifa — titles that he also held when his uncle Carlos María Fernández de Córdoba died. He was an indefatigable traveler, at the same time that he carried out numerous investigations, especially in the field of falconry, and founded the Spanish Museum of Trophy Hunting. In 1927 he was elected a member of the Royal Academy of Exact, Physical and Natural Sciences; His entrance speech was about birds of prey in falconry.

Considered one of the main exponents of big-game hunting in Europe, the duke made expeditions to British East Africa (1908-1909) and the North Pole (1910, 1921). In addition, he wrote numerous publications on hunting and nature, and in his palace in Madrid he founded a museum of natural history, the collection of which had to be transferred to the Museo Nacional de Ciencias Naturales at the outbreak of the Spanish Civil War in 1936.

After suffering a myocardial infarction, Luis Fernández de Córdoba died on July 13, 1956 in the now disappeared Palace of the Duke of Uceda in Madrid.  He is buried in the Basilica of Jesús de Medinaceli in Madrid.

Titles and styles

Titles

Dukedoms
17th Duke of Medinaceli (GE)
15th Duke of Alcalá de los Gazules (GE)
3rd Duke of Denia (GE)
13th Duke of Camiña (GE)
19th Duke of Cardona (GE)
12th Duke of Ciudad Real (GE)
17th Duke of Feria (GE)
15th Duke of Lerma (GE)
7th Duke of Santisteban del Puerto (GE)
17th Duke of Segorbe (GE)
3rd Duke of Tarifa (GE)

Marquessates
13th Marquess of Alcalá de la Alameda
13th Marquess of Aitona (GE)
15th Marquess of Cogolludo
16th Marquess of Comares
18th Marquess of Denia
10th Marquess of Navahermosa
16th Marquess of las Navas
13th Marquess of Malagón
14th Marquess of Montalbán
19th Marquess of Pallars
16th Marquess of Priego (GE)
12th Marquess of Solera
18th Marquess of Tarifa

10th Marquess of Torrecilla (GE)
18th Marquess of Villa Real
14th Marquess of Villafranca
14th Marquess of Villalba

Countships
18th Count of Alcoutim
51st Count of Ampurias
12th Count of Aramayona
23rd Count of Buendía
19th Count of Cocentaina
15th Count of Castellar
18th Count of Risco
18th Count of los Molares
18th Count of Medellín
7th Count of Ofalia

21st Count of Osona
25th Count of Prades
16th Count of Santa Gadea (GE)
16th Count of Valenza y Valladares
13th Count of Villalonso

Viscountcies
45th Viscount of Bas
43rd Viscount of Cabrera
11th Viscount of Linares
41st Viscount of Vilamur

Styles 
 16 January 188012 July 1956: The Most Excellent The Duke of Medinaceli

Selected works
 Diario de mi viaje alrededor del mundo en 1907, 1915
 Catálogo de aves europeas de mi colección, 1915
 Cómo cacé la jirafa de mi colección venatoria, 1915
 Expedición ártica en el verano de 1910, 1919
 Notas sobre la cacería en el África oriental inglesa, 1919
 Ballenas, focas y similares, 1924
 Aves de rapiña y su caza, 1927
 Expedición ártica en el verano de 1921, 1929
 La profecía de la bruja, 1940
 El elefante en la Ciencia, la Mitología, la Tradición y la Historia, 1941
 Breve historial de las armas de caza, 1942
 La caza de las aves de rapiña, 1942
 El alce y su caza, 1943
 Las aves de rapiña en la cetrería, 1943

Arms

Ancestors

See also

List of Famous Big Game Hunters

References

1880 births
1956 deaths
117
Grandees of Spain
19th-century Spanish nobility